The Star Route scandal involved a lucrative 19th-century scheme whereby United States postal officials received bribes in exchange for awarding postal delivery contracts in southern and western areas. On March 3, 1845, Congress had created inland mail routes, eventually known as "Star Routes", derived from the "* * *" postal registry designation. After the American Civil War, these highly sought-after routes increased due to rapid expansion in the Western and Southwestern regions of the United States. The potential for illicit profits made the Postal Service ripe for corruption and scandal due to defects in the Post Office laws and regulations.

The way the swindle worked was that contractors would first make low "straw" bids for the routes, while other contractors in the ring would make exorbitantly high bids. Through a series of default bidding, the ring contractor would receive the contract route at an exorbitant high price. Profits from the excessively high contracts would be split between ringleaders. The ring consisted of a complex relationship between brokers, contractors, and appointed members of the Post Office. Millions of dollars were being depleted from the national treasury.

Investigations by Congress into corruption began as early as 1872 during the Presidency of Ulysses S. Grant. This investigation result had been tainted by bribery, while an 1876 investigation managed to shut down the Star Route frauds temporarily. A resurgence of graft stealthily took place in 1878 during the Presidency of Rutherford B. Hayes, continuing into the Garfield Administration. In April 1880, another Congressional investigation was launched. President Hayes stopped further awarding of Star Route contracts.

In April 1881, President James A. Garfield launched an investigation into the Star Routes corruption. Garfield's investigation revealed among the major players involved were some of the large contractors, the ex-US Representative Bradley Barlow of Vermont, the Second Assistant Postmaster-General, Thomas J. Brady, some of the subordinates in the department, and Arkansas Senator Stephen W. Dorsey, who became Secretary of the Republican National Committee during Garfield's 1880 presidential campaign. After Garfield's assassination, Chester A. Arthur (who assumed the presidency) pursued the investigation.  Two federal prosecution trials took place in 1882 and 1883, and the postal ring was finally shut down.  Although the fraudulent scheme was widespread, there were few convictions. Many of the defendants in the Star Routes trials were successfully defended by noted lawyer and orator, Robert Ingersoll. Brady and Dorsey were acquitted by the jury in the 1883 trial. Public disgust over the Star Routes graft served as an impetus for civil service reform and the passage of the Pendleton Civil Service Reform Act in 1883.

See also
 Ulysses S. Grant presidential administration scandals

Notes

Political scandals in the United States
Grant administration controversies
Postal history of the United States